Verba is a Polish band from Piła formed in 1997. It originated from the Pop music group Squad Centralny. At first Bartek and Ignacy represented different music styles such as (techno, house, elektro and jungle). Later they became fascinated with hip-hop, at which point they began composing hip-hop music with Rap elements. Bartek took care of composing the songs, while at first Ignacy wrote the lyrics. Later, both of them attended to the lyrics. rap became a prevailing characteristic of their compositions and hip-hop took second stage.

The band influenced other Polish rap artists with similar styles like Ascetoholix, Jeden Osiem L, Mezo, Owal and 52 Dębiec some years ago. The first major label album  'Ósmy marca'  (they also have three demo CDs 'at account') increased the popularity of the band. Until now the duo has released six albums (four studio albums and two compilations) as well as nine video clips. They have also won a lot of awards.

History

Early bands
The first hip-hop formation was called BRAx2 and would later become Verba. The group began making music in 1997. The band included three people: Ignac, Wiktor and Witek. Soon afterwards it transformed to group Mechanizm. This band comprised the previous members plus Tylas, Biker and Rynias. They recorded material on two 'demos'. After a short time the group disintegrated. The members continued their activity and soon created a new hip-hop group Squad Centralny.

Squad Centralny 
The band included Ignac, Tylas and Bartas (as record producer). They recorded the 'illegal' CD  'Squad Centralny. Pierwsze natarcie'  (Squad Centralny. 1st attack). After Wiktor had joined them, the group released  'Drugie Natarcie Squadu Centralnego'  (2nd attack of Squad Centralny). It also planned the publication  'Trzecie Natarcie Squadu Centralnego'  (3rd attack of Squad Centralny).

After the departure of Tylas and Wiktor (producer of  'Gangland' ), they changed their name to VerbaFreniX and produced two video clips"  'Chora miłość” (Crazy {or ill} love) and „Wiem jak to jest (RMX)'  (I know how it is (Remix)). Later the duo adopted the name Verba and began producing rap.

Awards and nominations 

 Eska Music Awards 2006:
The band won in the category 'Debiut Roku' (Debut of the Year) and was also nominated for 'Album Roku' (Album of the Year) and 'Zespół Roku' (Band of the Year).
 Superjedynki 2006:
The album 'Dwudziesty pierwszy listopada' won in the category 'Płyta hiphopowa' (Best Hip Hop Album).

 Bravoora 2006:
The band came in third in the category 'Zespół/rap' (Band/Pop).
 Mikrofony Popcornu 2006:
Verba won a second prize in the category 'Hip Hop - Polska' (Hip hop - Poland) and the third prize as 'Zespół Roku - Polska' (Band of the Year).

Discography

Studio albums

Compilation albums

References

External links 

 Official site 

Polish hip hop groups